Doc Bar (1956–1992) was a Quarter Horse stallion that was bred to be a racehorse, became an outstanding halter horse, and in his sire career revolutionized the cutting horse industry.

Life

Doc Bar was foaled in 1956, and his sire was Lightning Bar, a son of Three Bars (TB). His dam was Dandy Doll, a daughter of Texas Dandy. Dandy Doll's dam was a descendant of Joe Reed P-3.

Offspring 
Among Doc Bar's famous offspring are Doc O'Lena, Doc's Dee Bar, Doc's Oak, Dry Doc, Doc's Marmoset, Doc's Dandy Doll, Doc's Haida, Doc's Starlight, Handle Bar Doc, Doc's Prescription, and Doc's Play Mate. Among his grandget are Smart Little Lena, Lenas Peppy, Royal Mahogany, and Lynx Melody.

Death and honors 
Doc Bar died on July 20, 1992, and was buried on the Jensen/Ward Doc Bar Ranch in Paicines, California.

Doc Bar was inducted into the American Quarter Horse Association's (or AQHA) AQHA Hall of Fame in 1993. In 2007 Western Horseman magazine chose Doc as number two on their list of top ten ranch horse bloodlines.

Pedigree

Notes

References

 All Breed Database Pedigree of Doc Bar retrieved on June 22, 2007

Further reading

 Close, Pat "Doc Bar: The Story Behind the Legend" Western Horseman July 1977
 Dixon, Cathy "The Doc Bar Heritage" Quarter Horse Journal June 1979
 Nettles, Gayla "Doc Bar: The Failed Racehorse who Became the King of Cutting" Quarter Horse Journal February 2002
 Robertson, Anna "The Doc Bar Influence in Cutting ... Will it Last?" Quarter Horse Journal January 1973

External links
 Doc Bar at Quarter Horse Directory
 Doc Bar at Quarter Horse Legends

American Quarter Horse racehorses
Racehorses bred in the United States
Racehorses trained in the United States
Cutting horses
American Quarter Horse sires
1956 animal births
1992 animal deaths
AQHA Hall of Fame (horses)